The 2017 Big Ten Men's Lacrosse Tournament was held May 4 and May 6 at Jesse Owens Memorial Stadium in  Columbus, Ohio. The winner of the tournament received the Big Ten Conference's automatic bid to the 2017 NCAA Division I Men's Lacrosse Championship. Four teams from the Big Ten conference competed in the single elimination event. The seeds were determined based upon the teams' regular season conference record. Maryland repeated as tournament champions, beating Ohio State 10-9.

Standings
Only the top four teams in the Big Ten Conference advanced to the Big Ten Conference Tournament.

Not including Big Ten Tournament and NCAA tournament results

Schedule

Bracket
Jesse Owens Memorial Stadium – Columbus, Ohio

Awards

 MVP: Connor Kelly, Maryland
 All-Tournament Team:
 Connor Kelly, Maryland
 Tim Rotanz, Maryland
 Tim Muller, Maryland
 Dan Morris, Maryland
 Tre Leclaire, Ohio State
 Jake Withers, Ohio State
 Ben Randall, Ohio State
 Freddy Freibott, Ohio State
 Shack Stanwick, Johns Hopkins
 Chris Sabia, Penn State

References

External links 
 2017 Big Ten Men's Lacrosse Tournament Central

2017 NCAA Division I men's lacrosse season
Big Ten Conference Men's Lacrosse
Big Ten men's lacrosse tournament